Lauri Koskela (16 May 1907 – 3 August 1944) was a Greco-Roman wrestler from Finland. He competed at the 1932 and 1936 Olympics and won a bronze and a gold medal, respectively. Koskela was the European champion in 1935, 1937 and 1938 and placed third in 1939. Domestically, he won seven titles in 1932–33, 1936 and 1940–43.

Kidnapping and death
Koskela lived in Lapua, South Ostrobothnia, where he worked at the State Cartridge Factory. Koskela was a member of the local trade union branch and the Communist Party of Finland. In 1930, he was kidnapped by the fascist Lapua Movement. Koskela represented the left-wing club Ponnistus until the fall of 1930, when he joined the right-wing Virkiä in order to make it to the Olympics, as the Finnish Workers' Sports Federation did not participate the games. Koskela was killed in action during the Continuation War in 1944.

See also
List of kidnappings
List of solved missing person cases

References

External links

1907 births
1930s missing person cases
1944 deaths
European Wrestling Championships medalists
Finnish communists
Finnish male sport wrestlers
Finnish military personnel killed in World War II
Formerly missing people
Kidnapped people
Medalists at the 1932 Summer Olympics
Medalists at the 1936 Summer Olympics
Missing person cases in Finland
Olympic bronze medalists for Finland
Olympic gold medalists for Finland
Olympic medalists in wrestling
Olympic wrestlers of Finland
People from Lapua
People from Vaasa Province (Grand Duchy of Finland)
Wrestlers at the 1932 Summer Olympics
Wrestlers at the 1936 Summer Olympics
Sportspeople from South Ostrobothnia
20th-century Finnish people